Boniewo refers to the following places in Poland:

 Boniewo, Kuyavian-Pomeranian Voivodeship
 Boniewo, Lublin Voivodeship
 Gmina Boniewo, rural gmina (administrative district) in Poland